George Ashworth Young (19 October 1878 – 5 October 1920) was an Australian rules footballer who played with Carlton in the Victorian Football League (VFL).

Notes

External links 

George Young's profile at Blueseum

1878 births
1920 deaths
Australian rules footballers from Melbourne
Carlton Football Club players
Essendon Association Football Club players